The Kingdom or Domain of Soissons was a rump state of the Western Roman Empire in northern Gaul, between the Somme and the Seine, that lasted for some 25 years during Late Antiquity. The rulers of the rump state, notably its final ruler Syagrius, were referred to as "kings of the Romans" (Latin: rex Romanorum) by the Germanic peoples surrounding Soissons, with the polity itself being identified as the Regnum Romanorum, "Kingdom of the Romans", by the Gallo-Roman historian Gregory of Tours. Whether this title was used by Syagrius himself or was applied to him by the barbarians surrounding his realm in a similar way to how they referred to their own leaders as kings is unknown. "Kingdom (or Domain) of Soissons" is a later, historiographical term for the state.

The Kingdom of Soissons began when Emperor Majorian (457–461) appointed Aegidius as magister militum of Roman Gaul. When Majorian was killed on the orders of Ricimer in 461, Aegidius maintained his own rule in the remnants of Roman Gaul. In the chaos of contemporary Gaul, he maintained his power against Franks to his east and Visigoths to his south.

Aegidius died in 464 or 465. His son Syagrius succeeded to the rule. In 486, Syagrius lost the Battle of Soissons to the Frankish king Clovis I and the domain was thereafter under the control of the Franks.

History

The Kingdom of Soissons originated in the reign of the Western Emperor Majorian (457–461). Majorian appointed Aegidius to be magister militum of the Gallic provinces. The remaining Roman territory in Gaul in the northwest was connected with the Roman possessions in the Auvergne, Provence and Languedoc which connected these to Italy. During Majorian's reign, that corridor was annexed by the Germanic tribes now occupying Gaul, thus effectively cutting off Aegidius and his citizens from the Empire. Majorian and Aegidius had recovered the Roman position in most of Gaul, but with the death of Majorian in 461 the Roman position in the center and south deteriorated. These provinces were annexed by the Visigoths and Burgundians in the years 462-477, which left the remaining Roman territories in Gaul isolated.

Aegidius was allied with the Alans, and with Childeric I, king of the Salian Franks of Tournai, and helped them defeat the Visigoths at Orléans in 463. According to Gregory of Tours, Aegidius even ruled the Franks during Childeric's banishment, but Childeric later returned from exile. It is possible that the Groans of the Britons, referring to a Romano-British request for military assistance after the Roman departure from Britain, may have been addressed to Aegidius.

Aegidius continued to govern until his death in 464. His comes, Paulus of Angers, was killed shortly afterwards, possibly on the same campaign. At that point Aegidius's son, Syagrius, took his place as ruler. Syagrius governed using the title of dux (a provincial military commander), but the neighboring Germanic tribes referred to him as "King of the Romans"; hence one of the nicknames of his enclave. In 476, under the rule of Syagrius, the Kingdom of Soissons failed to accept the new rule of Odoacer who had dethroned the Western Emperor earlier that year. While both Syagrius and Odoacer sent messengers to the Eastern Roman Empire, the Eastern emperor Zeno chose to offer legitimacy to Odoacer instead of Syagrius. The Kingdom of Soissons cut all ties with Italy and had no further recorded contact with the Eastern Roman Empire. Even after 476, Syagrius continued to maintain that he was merely governing a Roman province. The Domain of Soissons was in fact an independent region.

Childeric died about 481, and his son Clovis I became the Frankish king. Clovis made continual war against Syagrius, and in the end took over all his territory. Syagrius lost the final Battle of Soissons in 486; many historians consider this Clovis' greatest victory. Syagrius fled to the Visigothic king Alaric II, but the Franks threatened war if Syagrius were not surrendered to them. Syagrius was sent back to Clovis, who had him executed in 486 or 487.

Clovis I ruled the Franks until his death in 511. When he died, the Frankish realm was divided into four kingdoms, one for each of his sons. Clothar I received a portion centred in Soissons, where he had been born a decade after Syagrius' death. Clothar  survived all his brothers and their families - in one case by murdering the sons of a deceased brother - and eventually reunited the realm in 555.

When Clothar died in 561, the Frankish realm was divided into three kingdoms, one for each son. The portions centred around Soissons and Paris eventually developed into the kingdom of Neustria, which remained one of the key divisions of the Frankish realm.

Army

When Aegidius was appointed magister militum of Gaul by Emperor Majorian, he took control of the remaining Roman troops in Gaul. According to Eastern Roman writer Priscus, Aegidius and Syagrius both commanded "large forces". At one point, Aegidius and/or Syagrius even threatened the Western Roman Empire with an invasion of Italy if the empire did not grant their requests. Their forces also offered effective resistance to the power of the Visigoth Kingdom, to the south and west of Soissons. There are however no figures available that make it possible to come to a judgement on the total strength of their troops.

See also

Vase of Soissons

References

Notes

 
5th century in sub-Roman Gaul
Foreign relations of ancient Rome
Francia
Ancient Rome by period
5th century in the Roman Empire
486 disestablishments
5th-century establishments in the Roman Empire
480s disestablishments in the Roman Empire
457 establishments
Rump states